Staphylus ceos, the golden-headed scallopwing, is a species of spread-wing skipper in the butterfly family Hesperiidae. It is found in Central America and North America.

References

Further reading

External links

 

Staphylus (butterfly)
Articles created by Qbugbot